The Duggans were an Irish musical duo from Gweedore, County Donegal, Ireland.

The twin brothers Noel Duggan and Pádraig Duggan came to prominence in the 1970s with the folk group Clannad, and took a ten-year break after winning a Grammy Award for their 1998 album Landmarks. They later toured extensively with their band Norland Wind.  They were identified and introduced to television by Tony MacMahon,  and in 2005 released their first studio album Rubicon, which featured Moya Brennan, Finbar Furey and Órla Fallon among others.  It was met with critical acclaim and sold well throughout Ireland. Pádraig Duggan died in 2016 and Noel Duggan died in 2022.

Members
Twins Pádraig and Noel Duggan were born Ó Dúgáin on 23 January 1949 in Gweedore, County Donegal.  They were the youngest of seven and their older sister, Baba, married Leo Brennan who bought a pub, Innod Jack, which they helped to renovate and reopen as Leo's Tavern.  Their first language was Irish and they used a tape recorder to collect old Irish songs from elderly people in their village and on Tory Island.   

Pádraig died in Dublin on 9 August 2016, at the age of 67. Noel died in Donegal on 15 October 2022, at the age of 73.

Rubicon

In 2005, the Duggans recorded their début studio album, made up of traditional songs and ballads in the Irish language along with self-penned songs in English. The album features long-time collaborators Thomas Loefke and Kerstin Blodig of Norland Wind fame, Moya Brennan, Brídín Brennan and Celtic Woman's Órla Fallon.

Discography

Albums
 Rubicon (2005)

As part of Clannad

Compilations
Irish Ballads (various artists – 2005)

References

External Links
 

Clannad members
Celtic music groups
Irish folk musical groups
Musical groups from County Donegal
Irish twins
Sibling musical duos
Musical groups established in 2004
Musical groups disestablished in 2016
2004 establishments in Ireland
2016 disestablishments in Ireland